Saraswati Chaudhary may refer to:
 Saraswati Chaudhary, a Nepalese politician.
 Sarswati Chaudhary, a Nepalese female track and field athlete.
 Saraswati Chaudhary (volleyball), a Nepalese Volleyball player.